Francine Tacker (born September 15, 1946) is an American actress known for appearing as Jenna Wade in 2 episodes of the soap opera Dallas in 1980. Tacker was the second actress to play the character, succeeding Morgan Fairchild and preceding Priscilla Presley. She was also a regular on the television series The Paper Chase, playing Elizabeth Logan during the 1978–1979 season and on Empire in 1984. In 1980, she played reporter Camille Rittenhouse, a woman who shared an attic apartment with three other women, on the short-lived comedy series, Goodtime Girls.

She was married to actor Robert Ginty, whom she met during filming of The Paper Chase. Their son is actor James Francis Ginty. On Goodtime Girls, she worked with Ginty's second wife, actress Lorna Patterson (she played Betty Crandall to Francine's Camille).

References

External links

1946 births
People from Washington, D.C.
American television actresses
Living people
21st-century American women